This article is about the particular significance of the year 1963 to Wales and its people.

Incumbents

Archbishop of Wales – Edwin Morris, Bishop of Monmouth
Archdruid of the National Eisteddfod of Wales – Cynan

Events

February
2 February – Cymdeithas yr Iaith Gymraeg holds its historic first protest in Aberystwyth, in the form of a sit-down at Trefechan Bridge.
 9 February – The paramilitary Welsh nationalist organisation Mudiad Amddiffyn Cymru plants a bomb at the construction site of the Tryweryn reservoir.
date unknown – A record snowfall of nearly 5 ft (1.5m) occurs at Tredegar in Monmouthshire.

March
6 March – After record freezing weather throughout the winter, it is the first day of the year when there is no frost in Wales. 
28 March – Labour Party candidate Neil McBride wins the Swansea East by-election caused by the death of Labour Member of Parliament (MP) David Mort.

June
28 June – Caerphilly railway works closes.

August
August – Mandy Rice-Davies gives evidence at the trial of Stephen Ward, including the famous phrase, "Well, he would, wouldn't he?"

September
16 September – The Western Mail launches a fund-raising campaign to replace a stained glass window to replace the one shattered in the bombing of a church in Birmingham, Alabama, United States, by the Ku Klux Klan on the previous day; the £500 target is reached within days.

Date unknown
Dunraven Castle is demolished.

Arts and literature
The home and cultural centre of Gregynog Hall at Tregynon in Montgomeryshire is given to the University of Wales by owners and art-collectors, Margaret and Gwendoline Davies, granddaughters of Victorian industrialist David Davies.
A scientific journal in the Welsh language, Y Gwyddonydd, is launched.
The Beatles play at Mold 24 January; Cardiff 27 May; Abergavenny 22 June; Rhyl 19–20 July; and Llandudno 12–17 August.

Awards

National Eisteddfod of Wales (held in Llandudno)
National Eisteddfod of Wales: Chair – withheld
National Eisteddfod of Wales: Crown – Tom Parri Jones
National Eisteddfod of Wales: Prose Medal – William Llywelyn Jones

New books
Kenneth O. Morgan – David Lloyd George, Welsh Radical as World Statesman
Bertrand Russell – Essays in Skepticism
R. S. Thomas – The Bread of Truth
Clough Williams-Ellis – Portmeirion, the Place and its Meaning

Music
Arwel Hughes – Pantycelyn (oratorio)
Daniel Jones – The Knife (opera)
Grace Williams – Trumpet Concerto

Film
Richard Burton and Elizabeth Taylor star in Cleopatra.
Desmond Llewelyn makes his first appearance as "Q" in the James Bond series of films.
Rachel Roberts stars in This Sporting Life
Jack Howells wins the Academy Award for Dylan Thomas at the 35th Academy Awards in the category of Best Documentary Short. As of 2011 it is the only Welsh film to have won an Oscar.

Broadcasting
The ITV franchise Wales (West and North) Television (WWN) (also called "Teledu Cymru") becomes the only company in Independent Television history to go bankrupt, and is taken over by TWW.

Welsh-language television
Heno

English-language television
23 November – The first episode of BBC's new science fiction series Doctor Who, devised by Welshman Terry Nation, is broadcast.

Sport
BBC Wales Sports Personality of the Year – Howard Winstone

Births
22 January – Huw Irranca-Davies, politician
27 April – Russell T Davies, television screenwriter
14 May – Andrew Lewis, composer
8 June – Louise Jones, cyclist
15 June – Nigel Walker, athlete and rugby player
28 June – Peter Baynham, comedian
10 July – Ian Lougher, motorcycle racer
August – Rebecca Evans, operatic soprano
15 August (in Wolverhampton) – Simon Hart, politician, Secretary of State for Wales
12 September – Julie Roberts (artist), painter
19 October – Phil Davies, rugby union player
1 November – Mark Hughes, footballer and football manager
28 November – Charles Dale, television actor
7 December – Mark Bowen, footballer
16 December – Hugh Morris, cricketer
19 December – Paul Rhys, actor
28 December – Simon Thomas, politician

Deaths
1 January – David Mort, Labour MP for Swansea East, 74
11 January – Philippa Powys, novelist, 76
13 March – Margaret Davies, philanthropist, 78
15 January – Morgan Phillips, politician, 60
15 March – William Cove, politician, 74
28 March – Alec Templeton, composer, pianist and satirist, 52 
15 April – Edward V. Robertson, US senator, 81
25 May – William Lewis, chemist
17 June – John Cowper Powys, novelist, 90
6 July – John Osborn Williams, politician in Newfoundland, 77
29 July – Frank Moody, British boxing champion, 62
11 September – William Richard Williams, civil servant and politician, 68
26 September 
Goronwy Owen, politician, 82
Olive Wheeler, educationalist, 77
1 October – Tal Harris, Wales international rugby player, 61
11 October – Emlyn Garner Evans, lawyer and politician, 53
26 October – Horace Evans, royal physician, 60
16 December – Llewellyn Evans, Olympic hockey player, 84
20 December – Reg Skrimshire, Wales and British Lions rugby union player, 85
26 December – Gwynn Parry Jones, singer, 72
30 December – Rees Williams, footballer, 63

See also
1963 in Northern Ireland

Notes

 
Wales